This article serves as an index – as complete as possible – of all the honorific orders or similar decorations awarded by Pahang, classified by Monarchies chapter and Republics chapter, and, under each chapter, recipients' countries and the detailed list of recipients.

Awards

MONARCHIES

Pahang Royal Family 
They have been awarded :

 Sultan Ahmad Shah of Pahang : 
  Founding Grand Master and Member (DKP) of the Royal Family Order of Pahang (since 24 October 1977)
  Grand Master and Member 1st class (DK I) of the Family Order of the Crown of Indra of Pahang (since 1974)
  Founding Grand Master of the Grand Royal Order of Sultan Ahmad Shah of Pahang (SDSA, since 23 October 2010)
  Founding Grand Master and Grand Knight of the Order of Sultan Ahmad Shah of Pahang (SSAP, since 24 October 1977) with title Datuk Sri
  Knight Companion (DIMP), Grand Knight (SIMP) and Grand Master of the Order of the Crown of Pahang (since 1974) with title Datuk Sri
 Sultanah Kalsom binti Abdullah, sultan's second wife :
  Member 1st class of the Family Order of the Crown of Indra of Pahang (DK I) 
 Tengku Abdullah, Crown Prince of Pahang :
  Member 1st class of the Family Order of the Crown of Indra of Pahang (DK I) 
  Grand Knight of the Order of Sultan Ahmad Shah of Pahang (SSAP, 24.10.1980) with title Datuk Sri
  Grand Knight (or Datuk Sri) of the Order of the Crown of Pahang (SIMP) with title Datuk Sri
 Tunku Azizah Amina Maimuna Iskandariah, Crown Princess of Pahang & sister of Sultan Ibrahim Ismail of Johor :
  Member 1st class of the Family Order of the Crown of Indra of Pahang (DK I)
 Tengku Abdul Rahman, Tengku Muda, second son of the sultan
  Founding Grand Master and Member (DKP) of the Royal Family Order of Pahang (DKP, 24.10.2000)
  Member 2nd class of the Family Order of the Crown of Indra of Pahang (DK II) 
  Grand Knight of the Order of Sultan Ahmad Shah of Pahang (SSAP, 24.10.1980) with title Datuk Sri
  Grand Knight (or Datuk Sri) of the Order of the Crown of Pahang (SIMP) with title Datuk Sri
 Tengku Abdul Fahd Muadzam, Tengku Arif Temenggong, third son of the sultan
  Member 2nd class of the Family Order of the Crown of Indra of Pahang (DK II)
 Tengku Meriam, Tengku Putri Sri Lela Wangsa, first daughter of the sultan :
  Founding Grand Master and Member (DKP) of the Royal Family Order of Pahang (DKP, 24.10.2000)
  Member 2nd class of the Family Order of the Crown of Indra of Pahang (DK II) 
  Grand Knight (or Datuk Sri) of the Order of the Crown of Pahang (SIMP) with title Datuk Sri
 Tengku Muhaini, Tengku Putri Sri Teja, second daughter of the sultan :
  Member 2nd class of the Family Order of the Crown of Indra of Pahang (DK II) 
  Grand Knight (or Datuk Sri) of the Order of the Crown of Pahang (SIMP) with title Datuk Sri
 Tengku Aishah Marcella, Tengku Putri Sri Kamala, third daughter of the sultan :
  Member 2nd class of the Family Order of the Crown of Indra of Pahang (DK II) 
  Grand Knight (or Datuk Sri) of the Order of the Crown of Pahang (SIMP) with title Datuk Sri
 Tengku Nong Fatimah, Tengku Putri Sri Setia Bakti, fourth daughter of the sultan :
  Member 2nd class of the Family Order of the Crown of Indra of Pahang (DK II, 24.10.2000)
  Grand Knight (or Datuk Sri) of the Order of the Crown of Pahang (SIMP, 24.10.1988) with title Datuk Sri
 Tengku Shahariah, Tengku Putri Sri Bongsu, fifth daughter of the sultan :
  Member 2nd class of the Family Order of the Crown of Indra of Pahang (DK II)
  Grand Knight (or Datuk Sri) of the Order of the Crown of Pahang (SIMP, 24.10.2000) with title Datuk Sri
 Tengku Ibrahim, Tengku Arif Bendahara, eldest younger brother of the sultan.
  Grand Knight of the Order of Sultan Ahmad Shah of Pahang (SSAP) with title Datuk Sri
  Grand Knight (or Datuk Sri) of the Order of the Crown of Pahang (SIMP) with title Datuk Sri
 Tengku Abdullah, Tengku Arif Bendahara, second younger brother of the sultan.
  Member 2nd class of the Family Order of the Crown of Indra of Pahang (DK II, 25.10.2002), 
  Grand Knight of the Order of Sultan Ahmad Shah of Pahang (SSAP, 24.10.1992) with title Datuk Sri
  Grand Knight (or Datuk Sri) of the Order of the Crown of Pahang (SIMP) with title Datuk Sri
 Habibah, Cik Puan Bendahara, his wife  
  Knight Companion of the Order of Sultan Ahmad Shah of Pahang (DSAP, 25.10.2002) with title Datuk
  Grand Knight (or Datuk Sri) of the Order of the Crown of Pahang (SIMP) with title Datuk Sri
 Tengku Marsilla, their daughter
  Grand Knight (or Datuk Sri) of the Order of the Crown of Pahang (SIMP, 24.10.2009) with title Datuk Sri
 Tengku Azlan, younger brother of the sultan.
  Knight Companion of the Order of Sultan Ahmad Shah of Pahang (DSAP, 1989) with title Datuk
  Grand Knight (or Datuk Sri) of the Order of the Crown of Pahang (SIMP, 25.10.2002) with title Datuk Sri
 Tengku Omar, younger brother of the sultan. 
  Knight Companion of the Order of Sultan Ahmad Shah of Pahang (DSAP, 1994) with title Datuk
 Tengku Azman, younger brother of the sultan. 
  Knight Companion of the Order of Sultan Ahmad Shah of Pahang (DSAP) with title Datuk
  Grand Knight (or Datuk Sri) of the Order of the Crown of Pahang (SIMP, 25.10.2002) with title Datuk Sri
 Tengku Kamal Baharin, younger brother of the sultan. 
 Grand Knight of the Order of Sultan Ahmad Shah of Pahang (SSAP, 26.10.2005) with title Datuk Sri
  Knight Companion of the Order of the Crown of Pahang (DIMP, 24.10.1995) with title Dato’

 STATES of MALAYSIA

Johor Royal Family 
They have been awarded :

 Sultan Ibrahim Ismail of Johor :
  Member 1st class of the Family Order of the Crown of Indra of Pahang (DK I, 24.10.2011)

Kelantan Royal Family 
They have been awarded:

To be completed if any ...

Negeri Sembilan Royal Family 
They have been awarded :

To be completed if any ...

Perlis Royal Family 
They have been awarded :
 Tuanku Sirajuddin of Perlis :
  Member 1st class of the Family Order of the Crown of Indra of Pahang (DK I, 26.10.2005)
 Tuanku Fauziah (Tuanku Sirajuddin of Perlis's wife) :
  Member 1st class of the Family Order of the Crown of Indra of Pahang (DK I, 26.10.2005)

Selangor Royal Family 
They have been awarded :

To be completed if any ...

Terengganu Royal Family 
 Y.T.M. Tengku Dato’ Mustafa Kamil, Tengku Sri Bendahara Raja (Sultan Mizan Zainal Abidin's 1st yoUNger brother):
  Grand Knight (or Datuk Sri) of the Order of the Crown of Pahang (SIMP, 26.10.2003) with title Datuk Sri

Governors of Malacca 

 Mohd Khalil Yaakob ( 6th Yang di-Pertua Negeri of Malacca since 4 June 2004 ) : 
 Order of Sultan Ahmad Shah of Pahang : first  Knight Companion (DSAP), later  Grand Knight (SSAP) with title Datuk Sri
 Order of the Crown of Pahang  : first  Companion (SMP), later  Grand Knight (or Datuk Sri) (SIMP) with title Datuk Sri
 Zurina Binti Kassim, his wife 
  Grand Knight (or Datuk Sri) of the Order of the Crown of Pahang (SIMP) with title Datuk Sri

to be completed

 ASIAN MONARCHIES

Brunei Royal Family 
See also List of Malaysian Honours awarded to Heads of State and Royals

They have been awarded :

 Hassanal Bolkiah : 
  Member 1st class of the Family Order of the Crown of Indra of Pahang (DK I, 19.5.1984)
 Mohamed Bolkiah, sultan's brother : 
  Grand Knight of the Order of Sultan Ahmad Shah of Pahang (SSAP) with title Datuk Sri

to be completed

 EUROPEAN MONARCHIES

to be completed

REPUBLICS 

To be completed if any ...

See also 
 Mirror page : List of honours of the Pahang Royal Family by country

References 

 
Pahang